is a rare-type asteroid from the inner regions of the asteroid belt, classified as Mars-crosser and exceptionally slow rotator, approximately 4 kilometers in diameter. It was discovered on 16 March 1999, by Croatian astronomers Korado Korlević and Mario Jurić at Višnjan Observatory in Croatia.

Orbit and classification 

 orbits the Sun at a distance of 1.7–3.0 AU once every 3 years and 7 months (1,309 days). Its orbit has an eccentricity of 0.29 and an inclination of 12° with respect to the ecliptic. A first precovery was taken at Steward Observatory in 1992, extending the body's observation arc by 7 years prior to its official discovery observation.

Physical characteristics 

SDSS photometry characterized  as a rare and reddish L-type, which belong to the larger complex of stony asteroids.

Slow rotator and tumbler 

In September 2014, American astronomer Robert Stephens obtained a rotational lightcurve from photometric observations taken at the Center for Solar System Studies (CS3) in California. It gave an exceptionally long rotation period of  hours with a brightness amplitude of 0.55 magnitude, which makes it one of the slowest rotators known to exist. It is also a suspected tumbling asteroid, which show a non-principal axis rotation.

Diameter and albedo 

According to the survey carried out by NASA's Wide-field Infrared Survey Explorer with its subsequent NEOWISE mission,  measures 3.395 and 4.17 kilometers in diameter and its surface has an albedo of 0.287 and 0.176, respectively. The Collaborative Asteroid Lightcurve Link assumes a standard albedo for stony asteroids of 0.20 and calculates a diameter of 3.92 kilometers with an absolute magnitude of 14.4.

Numbering and naming 

This minor planet was numbered by the Minor Planet Center on 28 March 2002. As of 2018, it has not been named.

Notes

References

External links 
 Asteroid Lightcurve Database (LCDB), query form (info )
 Dictionary of Minor Planet Names, Google books
 Asteroids and comets rotation curves, CdR – Observatoire de Genève, Raoul Behrend
 Discovery Circumstances: Numbered Minor Planets (35001)-(40000) – Minor Planet Center
 
 

038063
Discoveries by Korado Korlević
Discoveries by Mario Jurić
038063
19990316